Mississippi Township may refer to:

 Mississippi Township, Crittenden County, Arkansas, in Crittenden County, Arkansas
 Mississippi Township, Desha County, Arkansas, in Desha County, Arkansas
 Mississippi Township, Sebastian County, Arkansas, in Sebastian County, Arkansas
 Mississippi Township, Jersey County, Illinois
 Mississippi Township, Mississippi County, Missouri

Township name disambiguation pages